Archaeosyodon is an extinct genus of dinocephalian therapsids. It was medium-sized, reaching about 1.5–2 m (4–5 ft) in length.

See also
 List of therapsids

References

Anteosaurs
Prehistoric therapsid genera
Permian synapsids of Asia
Prehistoric synapsids of Europe
Guadalupian synapsids
Fossil taxa described in 1960
Guadalupian genus first appearances
Guadalupian genus extinctions